Brookfield Community School may refer to: 

Brookfield Community School, Chesterfield
Brookfield Community School, Fareham

See also
Brookfield (disambiguation)